This is a list of airlines currently operating in Zimbabwe.

See also
 List of defunct airlines of Zimbabwe
 List of airports in Zimbabwe

References

Airlines of Zimbabwe
Zimbabwe
Airlines
Airlines
Zimbabwe